Alin Constantin Damian (born 11 April 1994) is a Romanian professional footballer who plays as a forward. In his career, Damian also played for teams such as FC Brașov, Unirea Tărlungeni, SR Brașov or Olimpic Cetate Râșnov, among others. He also played in the Norwegian fifth tier for Emblem IL.

Honours
Unirea Tărlungeni
Liga III: 2012–13

AFC Hărman
Liga IV: 2014–15

Corona Brașov
Liga III: 2020–21
Liga IV: 2019–20

References

External links
 
 
 Alin Damian at frf-ajf.ro

1994 births
Living people
Sportspeople from Brașov
Romanian footballers
Association football forwards
Liga I players
Liga II players
Liga III players
FC Brașov (1936) players
SR Brașov players
CS Unirea Tărlungeni players
CSM Corona Brașov footballers
Romanian expatriate footballers
Expatriate footballers in Norway
Romanian expatriate sportspeople in Norway